Mark Waddington may refer to:
 Mark Waddington (magician) (born 1989), English entertainer
 Mark Waddington (footballer) (born 1996), English footballer
 Mark Waddington (Doctors), a character from Doctors